Carryer Glacier is a heavily crevassed tributary glacier,  long, which drains westward from the central part of the Bowers Mountains and enters Rennick Glacier between Mount Soza and Mount Gow, Victoria Land, Antarctica. The glacier was named by the northern party of New Zealand Geological Survey Antarctic Expedition, 1963–64, for S.J. Carryer, former geologist with this party. The glacier lies situated on the Pennell Coast, a portion of Antarctica lying between Cape Williams and Cape Adare.

References 

Glaciers of Pennell Coast